Mohamed Taieb (born October 15, 1996) is a Tunisian rower. He placed 27th in the men's single sculls event at the 2016 Summer Olympics.

References

1996 births
Living people
Tunisian male rowers
Olympic rowers of Tunisia
Rowers at the 2016 Summer Olympics
Rowers at the 2014 Summer Youth Olympics
Competitors at the 2019 African Games
African Games gold medalists for Tunisia
African Games medalists in rowing
African Games silver medalists for Tunisia
21st-century Tunisian people